This is a list of Sami people who are Sami or who are of established Sami descent.

A
Nina Afanasyeva (born 1939), Russian-Sami politician and language activist
Aikia Aikianpoika (1591–1671), Finnish shaman
Matti Aikio (1872–1929) early Norwegian Sami writer
Pekka Aikio (born 1944), Finnish Sami politician, president of the Sami Parliament of Finland
Amoc (born 1984), Finnish rapper
Agneta Andersson (born 1958), Swedish Sami sculptor and educator
Karen Anette Anti (born 1972), Norwegian Sami politician
Aleksandra Andreevna Antonova (1932–2014), Russian, Kildin Sami teacher, writer, poet, translator
Linda Aslaksen (born 1986), Norwegian Sami street artist and educator

B
Quiwe Baarsen (died 1627), Norwegian Sami shaman
Astrid Båhl (born 1959), Norwegian Sami artist, designed the Sami flag
Samuel Balto (1861–1921), director, Norwegian Sami
Katarina Barruk (born 1994), Swedish Sami singer who performs in the Ume Sami language
Ellen-Sylvia Blind (1925–2009), Swedish Sami writer
Mari Boine (born 1956), musician,  Norwegian Sami
Jan Egil Brekke (born 1974), Swedish footballer
Leif Arne Brekke (born 1977), Norwegian Sami footballer
Fred Buljo (born 1988), Norwegian Sami rapper
Ella Holm Bull (1929–2006), Southern Sami teacher and writer

C
Milla Clementsdotter (1812–1892), Swedish Southern Sami  Christian advocate

D
Maja Dunfjeld (born 1947), Norwegian South Sami duodji expert

E
Monica Edmondson (born 1963), Swedish Sami glass artist
Hanne Grete Einarsen (born 1966), Norwegian Sami artist
Berit Marie Eira (born 1968), Norwegian Sami reindeer herder and politician
Berit Oskal Eira (born 1951), Norwegian Sami politician
Sandra Andersen Eira (born 1986), Norwegian Sami politician
Edel Hætta Eriksen (born 1921), Norwegian Sami schoolteacher and politician
Elisabeth Erke (born 1962), Norwegian Sami educator and politician
Erik Eskilsson (fl. 1687), Swedish Sami accused of blasphemy

F
Jon Henrik Fjällgren (born 1987), Swedish Sami singer and yoiker
Frode Fjellheim (born 1959), Norwegian Sami yoiker and musician
Anders Fjellner (1795–1876), Swedish Sami priest and poet
Ketil Flatnose (9th century), Norwegian Sami hersir
Per Fokstad (1890–1973), Norwegian Sami teacher and politician

G
Stig Gælok (born 1961), Norwegian Sami poet and children's book writer
Ailo Gaup (1944–2014), Norwegian Sami writer
Ailo Gaup (born 1979), Norwegian Sami motocross rider
Ingor Ánte Áilo Gaup (born 1960), Norwegian Sami actor, composer and folk musician
Johanne Gaup (born 1950), Norwegian Sami politician
Mikkel Gaup (born 1968), Norwegian Sami actor
Nils Gaup (born 1955), Norwegian Sami film director
Hans Guttorm (1927–2013), Norwegian Sami politician
Per Willy Guttormsen (born 1942), Norwegian Sami speed skater and politician

H
Aslak Hætta (1824–1854), a leader of the Kautokeino Rebellion
Barbro-Lill Hætta-Jacobsen (born 1972), Norwegian Sami politician
Ellen Inga O. Hætta (born 1953), Norwegian Sami politician and educator
Lars Hætta (1834–1896), Norwegian Sami reindeer herder and translator
Mattis Hætta (born 1959), Norwegian Sami singer
Hallbjorn Halftroll (9th century), Norwegian Sami hersir
Mette Henriette (born 1990), Norwegian Sami artist, Saxophonist and composer
Reidar Hirsti (1925–2001), Norwegian Sami newspaper editor and politician
Sami Hyppia, Finnish footballer

I
Mariela Idivuoma (born 1976), Swedish Sami journalist and festival host
Ella Marie Hætta Isaksen (born 1998), Norwegian Sami singer
Signe Iversen (born 1956), language consultant and children's writer

J
Anna Jacobsen (1924–2004), Norwegian Sami writer, translator and publisher
Sofija Efimovna Jakimovič (1940–2006), Kildin Sámi folklorist and author
Iver Jåks (1932–2007), Norwegian Sami artist
Ellinor Jåma (born 1979), Sami politician representing Åarjel-Saemiej Gielh
Sofia Jannok (born 1982), Swedish Sami artist, singer and radio host
Jonne Järvelä (born 1974), Finnish vocalist and guitarist 
Nils Jernsletten (1934–2012), Norwegian Sami academic and newspaper editor
Jonas Johansen (born 1985), Norwegian Sami footballer
Nils Jonsson (1804–1870), also known as Lapp-Nils, Swedish Sami violinist and composer
Siri Broch Johansen (born 1967), Norwegian Sami singer and educator
Agnete Johnsen (born 1994), Norwegian Sami singer
Tore Johnsen (born 1969), Norwegian Sámi priest and Sami church leader
Annelise Josefsen (born 1949), Norwegian Sami artist
Inga Juuso (1945–2014), Norwegian Sami singer and actress
Per Isak Juuso (born 1953), Swedish Sámi artisan and teacher

K
Ragnhild Vassvik Kalstad (born 1966), Norwegian Sami politician
Aili Keskitalo (born 1968), Norwegian Sami politician
Asa Kitok (1894–1986), Swedish Sami birch-root artisan
Finn Hågen Krogh (born 1990), cross-country skier

L
Ann-Helén Laestadius (born 1971), journalist and children's novelist
Hildá Länsman (born 1993), Finnish Sami singer
Lars Levi Læstadius (1800–1861), Swedish-born priest of Sami descent
Eirik Lamøy (born 1984), Norwegian footballer 
Anders Larsen (1870–1949), Norwegian Sami teacher, journalist and writer
Vibeke Larsen (born 1971), Norwegian Sami politician
Kristina Katarina Larsdotter (1819–1854), also Stor-Stina, exceptionally tall Swedish Sami
Rauni Magga Lukkari (born 1943), Northern Sami poet and translator
Gustav Lund (1862–1912), Norwegian Sami sled preacher and editor

M
Rika Maja (1661–1757), Swedish Sami shaman
Margareta (c.1369–c.1425), Swedish Sami missionary
Maria Magdalena Mathsdotter (1835–1873), Swedish Sami founder of Sami schools
Randi Marainen (born 1953), Norwegian-born Swedish Sami silversmith
Britta Marakatt-Labba (born 1951), Swedish Sami textile artist
Lajla Mattsson Magga (born 1942), Swedish-born Norwegian Sami teacher, children's writer and lexicographer
Ole Henrik Magga (born 1947), Norwegian Sami linguist and politician
Maxida Märak (born 1988), Swedish Sami yoik singer, musician, actress and rights activist
Espen Minde (born 1983), Norwegian footballer
Marja-Liisa Olthuis (born 1967), Finnish Sami writer
Sara Margrethe Oskal (born 1970), Norwegian Sami writer, actress, film director
Maria Magdalena Mathsdotter (1835–1873), Swedish Sami school founder
Matti Morottaja (born 1942), Finnish Sami politician and writer
Silje Karine Muotka (born 1975), Norwegian Sami politician
Marit Myrvoll (born 1953), social anthropologist, museum director

N
Marja Bål Nango (born 1988), Norwegian Sami filmmaker
Lars Nilsson (died 1693), Swedish Sami shaman
Ivar Nordkild (born 1941), Norwegian biathlete, gold medalist at the Biathlon World Championships 1966
Åge Nordkild (1951–2015), Norwegian Sami politician
Harriet Nordlund (born 1954), Swedish Sami actress and dramatist
Anne Nuorgam (born 1964), Finnish Sami politician
Sven-Roald Nystø (born 1956), Norwegian Sami politician
Steffen Nystrøm (born 1984), Norwegian Sami football player

O
Egil Olli (born 1949), Norwegian Sami politician
Kåre Olli (born 1959), Norwegian Sami politician
Anna-Lisa Öst (1889–1974), known as Lapp-Lisa, Swedish Sami gospel singer
Sara Margrethe Oskal (born 1970), Norwegian Sami writer, actress and film producer
Ida Ovmar (born 1995), Swedish Sami model

P
Anja Pärson (born 1981), retired Swedish Sami alpine skier
Helga Pedersen (born 1973), Norwegian Sami politician
Morten Gamst Pedersen (born 1981), Norwegian footballer
Steinar Pedersen (born 1947), Norwegian Sami politician
Lars Pirak (1932–2008), Swedish Sami artist and yoiker 
Ulla Pirttijärvi-Länsman (born 1971), Finnish Sami folk singer
Anders Porsanger (1735–1780), first Sami to receive a higher education
Helvi Poutasuo (1943–2017), Finnish Sami teacher, translator and newspaper editor

R
Israel Ruong (1903–1986), Swedish Sami linguist and politician 
Elsa Laula Renberg (1877–1931), Swedish Sami activist and politician

S
Wimme Saari (born 1959), Finnish Sami yoik singer
Isak Saba (1875–1921), Norwegian Sami teacher and politician
Erik Sandvärn (born 1975), Swedish Sami footballer
Börje Salming (1951–2022), Swedish ice hockey player
Tiina Sanila-Aikio (born 1983), musician, president of the Finnish Sami Parliament
Johan Sara (born 1963), Norwegian Sami musician, singer and composer
Johan Mikkel Sara (born 1953), Norwegian Sami politician
Máret Ánne Sara (born 1983), Norwegian Sami artist and writer
Ole K. Sara (1936–2013), Norwegian Sami politician
Sollaug Sárgon (born 1965), Norwegian Sami poet
Kirsti Saxi (born 1953), Norwegian Sami politician
Katarina Pirak Sikku (born 1965), Swedish Sami painter and photographer
Åsa Simma (born 1963), Swedish Sami actress and theatre director
Sigbjørn Skåden (1976-) Norwegian Sami poet and novelist.
Ellen Aslaksdatter Skum (1827–1895), Norwegian Sami reindeer herder involved in the Kautokeino uprising
Inger Smuk (born 1947), Norwegian Sami politician
Ánde Somby (born 1958), Norwegian Sami yoik artist and law professor
Liv Inger Somby (born 1962), educator, writer
Marry A. Somby (born 1953), children's writer
Mons Somby (1825–1854), a leader of the Kautokeino rebellion
Niillas Somby (born 1948), Norwegian Sami political rights activist
Karin Stenberg (1884–1969), Swedish Sami teacher and activist
Mikael Svonni (born 1950), Swedish Sami linguist

T
Ann-Mari Thomassen (born 1964), Norwegian Sami politician
Lisa Thomasson (1898–1932), also Lapp-Lisa, Swedish singer of Sami descent
Torkel Tomasson (1881–1940), Swedish Sami publisher and journalist
Johan Turi (1854–1936), first Sami writer

U
Inger Elin Utsi (born 1975), Norwegian Sami politician
Ingunn Utsi (born 1948), Norwegian sculptor, painter and illustrator
Nils Utsi (1943–2019), Norwegian Sami actor and film director
Per A. Utsi (born 1939), Norwegian Sami politician

V
Niko Valkeapää (born 1968), musician and yoik singer
Nils-Aslak Valkeapää (1943–2001), Finnish Sami writer, musician
Raimo Valle (born 1965), Norwegian Sami civil servant and politician
Ellen Marie Vars (born 1957), Norwegian Sami writer
Láilá Susanne Vars (born 1976), Norwegian Sami lawyer and politician
Torgeir Vassvik (born 1962), Norwegian Sami musician and composer
Kristine Andersen Vesterfjell (1910–1987), Norwegian Southern Sami reindeer herder and culture advocate

W
Sara Wesslin (born early 1990s), Finnish Sami journalist, supporter of the Skolt Sami language

See also
:Category:Sámi people
List of Sami women

Sami
Sami
Sami
Sami
Sámi-related lists